Anastasios "Takis" Kyriakides (born December 17, 1946) is a Greek-American businessman and inventor who is the founder and chief executive officer of NT Connect Holdings Inc. Kyriakides holds several patents and has founded a number of companies, including Lexicon Corporation, Mylex Corporation, Regency Cruise Lines, netTALK CONNECT and netTALK Maritime.

Early life and education
Anastasios Kyriakides was born in Athens, Greece, on December 17, 1946, and later immigrated to the United States, receiving a Bachelor of Science degree in business from Florida International University in 1975.

Career
In the 1970s, Kyriakides invented and patented the LK3000, the first handheld language translation machine, a consumer electronics device that translated words from English into 12 different languages. In 1978, he appeared as a guest on The Merv Griffin Show to discuss his invention.

In 1979, Kyriakides founded the Lexicon Corporation a NASDAQ listed company ("LEX") to further develop and market the LK3000. Lexicon was ultimately acquired by Nixdorf Computer of (Germany).

In 1983, Kyriakides founded the Mylex Corporation to develop and produce the first handheld optical scanner and VGA card for personal computers, and served as the company's president and chairman. Mylex stock was traded on the NASDAQ under the stock symbol MYLX until it was acquired as a wholly owned subsidiary of IBM.

In 1984, Kyriakides founded Regency Cruises Inc., which was listed at that time on the Nasdaq stock exchange under the ticker symbol SHIP, and served as its chairman and secretary.

Regency Cruises was formed by Anastasios (Takis) Kyriakides as founder and chairman and William Schanz as president. 

Ships under Regency:
Regent Calypso,
Regent Jewel,
Regent Rainbow,
Regent Sea,
Regent Spirit,
Regent Star,
Regent Sun.

In 1987, Wolfson Campus at Miami Dade College in downtown Miami dedicated The Kyriakides Plaza to the family in honor of his philanthropic efforts to the college.  

In 1991, Kyriakides Founded Seawind Cruise line, and served as Chairman and CEO.

In 1995, Kyriakides Founded Tropicana Cruises, the only ship to visit Bimini on a daily basis. 

Meet the Anastasios and Maria Kyriakides Endowed Teaching Chair: Kimberly Carter - The Miami Dade College (MDC) Endowed Teaching Chair is annual program recognizes outstanding faculty who continuously strive to accomplish MDC’s mission 

In 2008, Kyriakides was inducted into the Miami Dade College Hall Of Fame for Entrepreneurship 

Kyriakides founded and presently serves as chief executive officer of NT Connect Holdings, Inc and netTALK Maritime, and is the co-inventor of the netTALK DUO, a consumer electronics VoIP device for making telephone calls over an internet connection. More information can be found at Kyriakides biography online

References

1946 births
Living people
American technology chief executives
Businesspeople from Miami
Florida International University alumni